Mohammed Enyass (Arabic:محمد إنياس; born 23 March 1982) in Senegal is a retired Qatari of Senegalese descent who was a footballer.

External links
 

Qatari footballers
1982 births
Living people
Al-Wakrah SC players
Al-Sailiya SC players
Umm Salal SC players
Naturalised citizens of Qatar
Qatar Stars League players
Qatari Second Division players
Association football goalkeepers